Henry James Beach (born 9 March 1942), known as Jim Beach or "Miami" Beach, is a British lawyer and band manager, best known for being the long-time manager of the rock band Queen, its individual members and the comedy group Monty Python. He was nicknamed "Miami" by Freddie Mercury, a play on his surname. He took over as manager of the band in 1978 after he had acted on their behalf as a lawyer.

Beach is co-founder of Transistor Project, together with Blur's Dave Rowntree. Beach is also the co-founder of the Mercury Phoenix Trust, which promotes AIDS prevention worldwide. Beach lives in Montreux, Switzerland.

Early life 
Beach was born in Gloucester. He was educated at Cheltenham College and Queens' College, Cambridge, where he read law. He was a member of the Cambridge Footlights and in 1963 went on a road tour of England and Scotland with Monty Python's Eric Idle and Graeme Garden as the piano player.

Family
He is married to Claudia Beach and has a daughter, Matilda, and a son, Ol. Ol Beach is the frontman for the band Yellowire and was formerly the keyboard player for the rock band Wire Daisies, discovered by Queen's Roger Taylor.

In popular culture 
Beach was a producer in the 2018 film Bohemian Rhapsody. He was portrayed in the film by Tom Hollander.

References

1942 births
Queen (band)
English music managers
Living people
Alumni of Queens' College, Cambridge
English expatriates in Switzerland
People from Montreux
Golden Globe Award-winning producers